The Memorial Bridge is a structure that crosses the Youghiogheny River, connecting the eastern and western shores of Connellsville, Pennsylvania, USA.

The bridge was constructed in 1952 as part of a new routing a U.S. Route 119 (US 119) on a four-lane highway around the city center. In 1982, the structure was rehabilitated as part of a decade long widening of the route through Fayette County, that included the creation of a freeway bypass in Uniontown,  to the south. In 2009–10, the road was again reconstructed, this time to accommodate improved pedestrian pathways. The walkways were widened as part of a plan to connect the Great Allegheny Passage, the Washington, D.C. to Pittsburgh trail that runs just past the western bridge approach, to an extension of the small Coal & Coke Trail, which currently runs from Mount Pleasant to Scottdale, Pennsylvania.

See also
 
 
 
 List of crossings of the Youghiogheny River

References

External links
"Two years of traffic delays at Memorial Bridge nearing end", Herald Standard, 8 November 2010 
National Bridges

Bridges in Fayette County, Pennsylvania
Monuments and memorials in Pennsylvania
Bridges completed in 1952
1952 establishments in Pennsylvania
Road bridges in Pennsylvania
Bridges of the United States Numbered Highway System
U.S. Route 19
Bridges over the Youghiogheny River
Girder bridges in the United States